The Malibu Country Mart (also the Country Mart or MCM) is a large outdoor lifestyle center or "boutique mall" located in the heart of Malibu at the Civic Center of Malibu, California. The center features a popular public playground, outdoor dining and picnic area, unique sculptures and public art, multiple restaurant options, free Wi-Fi, and on-site parking.

Description
Its buildings are a mix of architectural styles, displaying Spanish, Mediterranean, modern, and rustic influences. Other features of the property include unique gardens and sculptures, outdoor dining and picnic areas, and a children's playground.

Because of its high end retailers, the Malibu Country Mart has been a destination for the famous and the well-heeled who inhabit the beachfront property west of Los Angeles.  The Malibu Civic Center area is the primary local gathering place, known for being frequented by locals and visitors, alike.  Some reports suggest that the area has also become an increasingly popular venue for paparazzi.

Limited development and high demand continue to lead to rising real estate prices, and in turn lead to a market in which each successive generations of property buyers is typically wealthier than the one that preceded them. These demographic trends help to explain both a burgeoning market for luxury goods and a diminishing market for prosaic and practical homegoods. Some in Malibu are said to express concern that there will be a "multitude of places to buy a $200 t-shirt, but no place to buy a hammer or a nail."

Location 
The Malibu Country Mart is located one block off the Pacific Coast Highway in the heart of the Malibu Civic Center, minutes away from Pepperdine University, Malibu High School (MHS), and the Malibu Pier.

The property is approximately 20 minutes from West Los Angeles, the City of Santa Monica, the San Fernando Valley, and the Conejo Valley.

Ownership
The property was purchased in 1986 by Koss Companies, now known as  Koss Real Estate Investments.

Malibu Legacy Park Project 

Directly adjacent to the Malibu Country Mart is a currently vacant,  plot of land formerly owned by billionaire media tycoon and Colony resident Jerry Perenchio and sold to the City of Malibu in 2005 with strict deed restrictions prohibiting any commercial use.

Current plans for the site involve the development of a state-of-the-art park that is said to work as an "environmental cleaning machine", reducing pollution impacts in Malibu Creek, Malibu Lagoon, and the world-famous Surfrider Beach while simultaneously improving water quality, restoring a native riparian habitat, and preserving open space.  The project will be linked by a "linear park" to the neighboring Surfrider Beach, Malibu Pier, Malibu Lagoon, and Malibu Bluffs Park.

Between Cross Creek Road and Webb Way east to west, and between Civic Center Way and PCH north to south, it has been the site of the annual Labor Day Weekend Chili Cook-Off festival since 1982.

Tenants
The Malibu Country Mart has 67 merchants encompassing a variety of upscale boutiques, restaurants, spa services, and art galleries.  Many new tenants have signed leases at the Malibu Country Mart in recent years.

Retailers 
 All Things Bell
 ba&sh
 Bleusalt
 Brandy Melville
 Chrome Hearts
 Faherty Brand
 John Varvatos
 M.FREDRIC
 Malibu Colony Co.
 PAIGE
 Ralph Lauren
 Ron Herman
 Sunroom
 Tobi Tobin
 Vince
 Vuori

Dining 
 Tra di Noi
 Taverna Tony
 Lucky's Steakhouse
 John's Garden
 Starbucks
 SunLife Organics
 Malibu Mutt's Grill
 Malibu Kitchen

Gallery

References

External links 
Shopping Malls in the United States

Upscale Shopping in Malibu from Malibu Complete

Buildings and structures in Malibu, California
Shopping malls on the Westside, Los Angeles
Tourist attractions in Malibu, California